Rawtenstall is a town in Rossendale, Lancashire, England.  Associated with it, or nearby, are the communities of Waterfoot, Newchurch, Ewood Bridge, Lumb, Water, Crawshawbooth, Goodshaw, and Love Clough.  The area contains 97 buildings that are recorded in the National Heritage List for England as designated listed buildings.  Of these, eight are listed at Grade II*, the middle grade, and the others are at Grade II, the lowest grade.  Until the coming of the Industrial Revolution the area was rural, and most of the oldest listed buildings are, or originated as, farmhouses, farm buildings, cottages and larger houses.  A former packhorse bridge has survived, and is listed.  The earliest evidence of industry is in the weavers' cottages, some of which are listed.  Later came the mills; some of these have survived and are listed.  The other listed buildings are those associated with the growing population and include churches and associated structures, public houses, shops, a bank, schools, a library, the gateway to the cemetery, and war memorials.

Key

Buildings

References

Citations

Sources

Lists of listed buildings in Lancashire
Buildings and structures in the Borough of Rossendale